Haiti competed at the 1976 Summer Olympics in Montreal, Quebec, Canada. Haiti sent ten track and field athletes and three boxers to the games. As the athletes were amateurs, picked by President Jean-Claude "Baby Doc" Duvalier out of his personal friends, they had remarkedly poor times, with Dieudonné LaMothe earning the worst results ever at the 5000 metres. Among the officials was Gérard Raoul Rouzier, who served on the Football Disciplinary Commission.

Results by event

Athletics

Women's 100 metres
 Antoinette Gauthier
 Round 1 — 13.11 seconds (→ did not advance)

Women's 200 metres
 M. Louise Pierre
 Round 1 — 28.19 seconds (→ did not advance)

Women's 400 metres
 Rose Gauthier
 Round 1 — 1:13.27 (→ did not advance)

Men's 100 metres
 Philippe Etienne
 Round 1 — 11.05 seconds (→ did not advance)

Men's 200 metres
 Philippe Etienne
 Round 1 — 22.57 seconds (→ did not advance)

Men's 400 metres
 Wilfrid Cyriaque
 Round 1 — 51.49 seconds (→ did not advance)

Men's 800 metres
 Wilnor Joseph
 Round 1 — 2:15.26 (→ did not advance)

Men's 1500 metres
 Emmanuel Saint-Hilaire
 Round 1 — 4:23.41 (→ did not advance)

Men's 5000 metres
 Dieudonné Lamothe
 Qualifying round — 18:50.07 (→ did not advance)

Men's 10000 metres
 Charles Olemus
 Qualifying round — 42:00.11 (→ did not advance)

Men's Marathon
 Thanculé Dezart — did not finish (→ no ranking)
 Charles Olemus — did not start (→ no ranking)

Boxing

Lightweight (−60 kg)
 Yves Jeudy 
 Round 1 — Bye
 Round 2 — Won by forfeit
 Round 3 — Bye
 Quarterfinals — Lost to Ace Rusevski of Yugoslavia, referee stopped fight in the 2nd round (→ did not advance)

Light Welterweight (−63.5 kg)
 Siergot Sully
 Round 1 — Lost to Ismael Martinez of Puerto Rico, 5–0 (→ did not advance)

Welterweight (−67 kg)
 Wesly Felix
 Round 1 — Bye
 Round 2 — Won by forfeit
 Round 3 — Lost to Clinton Jackson of the United States, knocked out in the 1st round (→ did not advance)

References

Notes
 Official Report

Nations at the 1976 Summer Olympics
1976 Summer Olympics
Summer Olympics